Gürhan Gürsoy (born 24 September 1987) is a retired professional footballer. Born in Bulgaria, he represented Turkey internationally.

Playing career
Gürsoy was transferred from Adanaspor to Fenerbahçe in June 2004. On 12 July 2009, he was sent to Antalyaspor on loan for 1 year.

References

External links
 
 
 

1987 births
Living people
People from Kardzhali
Turkish footballers
Turkey under-21 international footballers
Turkey youth international footballers
Bulgarian footballers
Bulgarian Turks in Turkey
Association football midfielders
Adanaspor footballers
Fenerbahçe S.K. footballers
Sivasspor footballers
Antalyaspor footballers
Göztepe S.K. footballers
Hatayspor footballers
Sarıyer S.K. footballers
Nazilli Belediyespor footballers